The yellow-headed goby (Gobius xanthocephalus) is a species of goby native to the eastern Atlantic Ocean from northern Spain to Madeira and Canary Islands, and also in the Mediterranean Sea where it is found in inshore waters at depths of from  and can be found living under stones.  This species can reach a length of  TL.

References

External links
 

yellow-headed goby
Fauna of the Canary Islands
Fish of the Mediterranean Sea
Marine fauna of North Africa
yellow-headed goby